Scottish Open may refer to:

Scottish Open (golf), a golf tournament on the European Tour
Scottish Senior Open, a golf tournament on the European Seniors Tour
Scottish Open (badminton), an open international badminton championships held in Scotland since 1907
Scottish Open (darts), a professional darts tournament first held in 1983
Scottish Open (snooker), a professional snooker tournament
Scottish Open (fencing), a fencing competition held in Edinburgh in early January
Scottish Open (speedway), a motorcycle speedway championship